Donald Wellington Shaw (born February 23, 1944) is an American former professional baseball pitcher who appeared in 138 games over all or parts of five seasons in Major League Baseball (MLB) between  and  for the New York Mets, Montreal Expos, St. Louis Cardinals and Oakland Athletics. He was the winning pitcher in the Expos' first-ever game in franchise history against the Mets at Shea Stadium in New York City in April 1969.

Early career
He attended San Diego State University on a baseball scholarship and was selected by the Mets in the 35th round in the 1965 Major League Baseball draft. After two seasons in New York's farm system, Shaw made the 1967 Mets' roster out of spring training and spent his entire rookie campaign with them, working in 40 games, all in relief, and posting a 4–5 record and three saves, with a 2.98 earned run average.

Won Expos' first-ever game
The Mets exposed him to the expansion draft, and Montreal chose him with their 21st selection, 40th overall.

After making the Expos' maiden roster, he entered the first National League game in their history on Opening Day, April 8, 1969, in the sixth inning with the score tied, 6–6. He hurled three hitless innings, walking two, as Montreal surged in front, 11–6, aided by home runs from Rusty Staub and Coco Laboy. Shaw struggled in the ninth inning, allowing a walk and three hits, including a three-run, pinch-hit home run by Duffy Dyer, but he departed with Montreal still ahead 11–10. Carroll Sembera, who relieved him, put the tying and winning runs on base before nailing down the save.

1971 campaign
Shaw started the 1970 season in Triple-A, and his contract was sold to the Cardinals in mid-May; he got into only 14 games all year due to a broken hand and didn't return to MLB until April 1971, when he was recalled from Tulsa and added to the St. Louis bullpen corps. Shaw responded with ten consecutive scoreless relief appearances, not allowing a run between April 29 and June 2, and picking up two wins and a save. Shaw finished  with a 2.65 earned run average and a 7–2 won–lost mark.

After making three appearances, Oakland sent him to Triple-A Iowa. He played in the high minors through 1973 and then retired from professional baseball.

In his 138 MLB games, Shaw compiled a 13–14 record and a career 4.01 earned run average, with six career saves. He made one career start. In 188 innings pitched, he allowed 166 hits and struck out 123 batters. But he also allowed 101 bases on balls.

References

External links

1944 births
Living people
American expatriate baseball players in Canada
Auburn Mets players
Baseball players from Pittsburgh
Buffalo Bisons (minor league) players
Greenville Mets players
Iowa Oaks players
Jacksonville Suns players
Major League Baseball pitchers
Marion Mets players
Montreal Expos players
New York Mets players
Oakland Athletics players
St. Louis Cardinals players
San Diego State Aztecs baseball players
Baseball players from Los Angeles
Toledo Mud Hens players
Tulsa Oilers (baseball) players
Vancouver Mounties players
Williamsport Mets players
Winnipeg Whips players